Charles Coon may refer to:
 Charles E. Coon (1842–1920), American politician from the state of Washington
 Charles L. Coon (1868–1927), teacher, school administrator and child labor reformer
 Charles Coon (bridge) (1931–2003), American bridge player